Tamás Jordán (born 15 January 1943) is a Hungarian actor. Jordán appeared in more than ninety films since 1969.

Selected filmography

References

External links 
 

1943 births
Living people
Hungarian male film actors
20th-century Hungarian male actors
21st-century Hungarian male actors
Male actors from Budapest